Millon is a French-origin name. Notable persons with the name include:

 Adolpho Millon Júnior (1895–1929), Brazilian footballer
 Charles Millon (born 1945), French politician
 Eugène Millon (1812-1867), French chemist known for Millon's reagent
 Mark Millon (born 1971), American lacrosse player
 Theodore Millon (1928–2014), American psychologist